Fox's mountain meadow snake (Thamnophis foxi, meaning "Fox's hidden snake"; culebra-de vega de Fox in Spanish) is a species of viviparous colubrid snake, described by Douglas A. Rossman and Richard M. Blaney in 1968, which is endemic to northwestern Mexico.

Etymology
The specific name, foxi, is in honor of American herpetologist Wade Fox Jr. (1920–1964).

Pictures

Conservation status
While no detailed location information is included in the specimen record, it is noted that the same collector visited this location almost yearly in the late 1960s.

Threats to the survival of this snake species include ongoing deforestation caused by logging. The area contains pine and pine-oak forests of Pinus durangensis that have been heavily logged and are now severely disturbed. Parts of the area are being reforested for forestry purposes, but it is not known whether reforested Pinus durangensis stands are suitable for this snake species.

References

Further reading
Rossman DA, Blaney RM (1968). "A new Natricine snake of the genus Adelophis from western Mexico". Occasional Papers of the Museum of Zoology, Louisiana State University 35: 1-12. (Adelophis foxi, new species).

Thamnophis
Snakes of North America
Endemic reptiles of Mexico
Fauna of the Sierra Madre Occidental
Natural history of Durango
Reptiles described in 1968
Taxa named by Douglas A. Rossman